Bo Vestergaard (born 27 November 1965) is a Danish lightweight rower. He won a gold medal at the 1992 World Rowing Championships in Montreal with the lightweight men's eight.

References

1965 births
Living people
Danish male rowers
World Rowing Championships medalists for Denmark